Charlotte Aubin (born September 4, 1991 in Montreal, Quebec) is a Canadian actress from Quebec. She is most noted for her performance in the film Isla Blanca, for which she received a Prix Iris nomination for Best Actress at the 20th Quebec Cinema Awards in 2018.

She has also appeared in the films Romeo and Juliet, 9 (9, le film), Crème de menthe, Those Who Make Revolution Halfway Only Dig Their Own Graves (Ceux qui font les révolutions à moitié n'ont fait que se creuser un tombeau), Les Salopes, or the Naturally Wanton Pleasure of Skin, Ça sent la coupe, Mad Dog Labine, Goodbye Happiness (Au revoir le bonheur) and Heirdoms (Soumissions), and the television series Providence, Blue Moon, L'Échappée, Fugueuse and Virage.

Originally from Carignan, Quebec, she is a graduate of the National Theatre School of Canada. She has published a poetry collection, Paquet d'trouble.

References

External links

1991 births
21st-century Canadian actresses
21st-century Canadian poets
21st-century Canadian women writers
Canadian film actresses
Canadian television actresses
Canadian poets in French
Canadian women poets
French Quebecers
Actresses from Montreal
Writers from Montreal
Living people
National Theatre School of Canada alumni